Karev is a Slavic masculine surname with Kareva being its feminine counterpart. Notable people with the surname include:

Alexei Karev (1879–1942), Russian painter
Andrei Karev (born 1985), Belarusian ice hockey player
Leonid Karev (born 1969), Russian composer, organist and pianist
Nikola Karev (1877–1905), Macedonian revolutionary
Sergei Karev (born 1986), Russian figure skater
Yevgeni Karev (born 1985), Russian football player

Kareva is also an Estonian surname, both masculine and feminine
 Doris Kareva (born 1958), Estonian poet and translator

Fictional
Alex Karev, a character on the ABC television series Grey's Anatomy